Paonias excaecatus, the blinded sphinx, is a moth of the family Sphingidae. The species was first described by James Edward Smith in 1797.

Distribution 
It is found in Nova Scotia, New Brunswick and Prince Edward Island, and across the rest of Canada all the way to British Columbia. In the United States it ranges south to Florida in the east, and westward to eastern California and as far south as central Texas.

Description 
The wingspan is 60–85 mm. Adult moths are nocturnal; after a brief bout of activity after dusk, they seem to prefer the later hours of the night.

The eggs are greenish yellow and small. Hornworms hatch after about 8 days. Primary food sources for the larvae are deciduous trees such as willows, birch and cherries, as well as shrubberies, like ninebark and roses. Like the rest of the family Sphingidae, they burrow shallowly into soil to pupate. Once they leave their pupa, the adults almost immediately mate. Adults do not feed.

Gallery

References

External links
Oehlke, Bill "Paonias excaecatus, The Blinded Sphinx J. E. Smith, 1797" Sphingidae of Prince Edward Island. Archived May 13, 2006.

Paonias
Moths of North America
Moths described in 1797